3001 may refer to:
 3001, the post code of Melbourne Australia
 3001, the first year of the 31st century and the 4th millennium.
 3001 (Dance or Die album), a 1991 album
 3001 (Rita Lee album), a 2000 album
 3001: A Laced Odyssey, a 2016 album by Flatbush Zombies
 3001: The Final Odyssey, a 1997 novel by Arthur C. Clarke

See also